The Brown Album may refer to:

The Brown Album (Bootsauce album)
The Brown Album (Martin/Molloy album), a comedy album by Tony Martin and Mick Molloy
Brown Album, an album by Primus
The Band (album) or The Brown Album, an album by The Band
Orbital (1993 album) or The Brown Album, an album by Orbital
The Brown Album, the original 1970 release of Jesus Christ Superstar